David Raymond Jones  (born 18 March 1934) is an Anglican priest and former Royal Navy chaplain. Jones was Director of Ordinands for the Royal Navy from 1977 to 1980 and an Honorary Chaplain to The Queen from 1984 to 1989. He was Warden and Director of the Divine Healing Mission from 1989 to 1997.

Early life and education
Jones was born in Carmarthenshire, Wales, on 18 March 1934. He attended two independent boarding schools: St Michael's School in Carmarthenshire and Truro School in Cornwall. In 1946, his brother died after experiencing vivid deathbed phenomena; his father died in a road accident the following year. While at school, Jones was bedridden for a year with polio and told he would never walk again, though he later made a full recovery.

He initially attended the University of Wales Trinity Saint David from 1951 to 1954. In September 1954, he matriculated as an undergraduate at two Oxford colleges: St. Catherine's College and Wycliffe Hall. He received his B.A. in 1957 and his M.A. in 1961.

Ordained ministry
In September 1958, Jones was ordained in the Church of England at Exeter Cathedral by bishop Robert Mortimer. He began his career as a curate at St David's Church, Exeter from September 1958 to July 1960. He was then curate at Tamerton Foliot from July 1960 to January 1961, and at the Church of St Mary, Bideford from January 1961 to September 1963. Following this, he was the school chaplain of Grenville College until July 1966.

Jones joined the Royal Navy in September 1966. He was chaplain to several of Her Majesty's Ships, including HMS Illustrious, HMS Invincible, HMS Mercury, HMS Osprey, HMS Triumph, and HMS Drake, and served in the Falklands War. He also served as chaplain to RNH Mtarfa, the Royal Navy's main hospital in Malta, and to its senior base there. From 1977 to 1980, he was Director of Ordinands for the Royal Navy. In 1978, he returned to England to take up the post of Naval Director of the Royal Army Chaplains' Department, located in Amport House. On 11 June 1984, he was appointed an Honorary Chaplain to The Queen, succeeding bishop Noël Jones.

In 1989, Jones left the Navy and was given the post of Warden and Director of the Divine Healing Mission. He has been semi-retired since 1997, when he left the Divine Healing Mission. Since 2009, he has resided in Steyning, West Sussex, where he is an honorary chaplain at St Andrew and St Cuthman's Church.

Explanatory notes

References

1934 births
Living people
People educated at St Michael's School, Llanelli
People educated at Truro School
Alumni of the University of Wales, Lampeter
Alumni of St Catherine's College, Oxford
Alumni of Wycliffe Hall, Oxford
Royal Navy chaplains
Honorary Chaplains to the Queen
20th-century Church of England clergy
21st-century Church of England clergy